SS Chief Osceola was a Liberty ship built in the United States during World War II. She was named after Chief Osceola, resistance leader of the Seminole, during the Second Seminole War.

Construction 
Chief Osceola was laid down on 28 August 1944, under a Maritime Commission (MARCOM) contract, MC hull 2322, by J.A. Jones Construction, Panama City, Florida; sponsored by Mrs. W. T. Flythe , wife of director of public relation JAJCC, and launched on 4 October 1944.

History
She was allocated to United States Navigation Company, 19 October 1944.

She was sold, on 30 January 1947, to George D. Gratsos Ltd, for $563,292.75 and commercial use. She was flagged in Greece and renamed George D. Gratos. On 26 July 1965, she was severely damaged when she was grounded in the Chacao Channel, Chile. She was scrapped in Valencia, in 1967.

References

Bibliography 

 
 
 
 

 

Liberty ships
Ships built in Panama City, Florida
1944 ships
Maritime incidents in 1965